The Marine Academy of Technology and Environmental Science (MATES) is a comprehensive, selective magnet public high school with a focus on marine and environmental science that is part of the Ocean County Vocational School District. The school is located in the Manahawkin section of Stafford Township, in Ocean County, New Jersey, United States directly behind the buildings of the Southern Regional School District and a joint parking lot with Ocean County College's Southern Education Center. As a public school, students attend the school at no charge. Prospective students must complete the application process which includes an entrance exam. The school has been accredited by the Middle States Association of Colleges and Schools Commission on Elementary and Secondary Schools since 2005.

As of the 2021–22 school year, the school had an enrollment of 274 students and 22.0 classroom teachers (on an FTE basis), for a student–teacher ratio of 12.5:1. There were 10 students (3.6% of enrollment) eligible for free lunch and 2 (0.7% of students) eligible for reduced-cost lunch.

The school's stated mission is to provide an opportunity to students in Ocean County to become intimate thinkers and problem solvers. Students of the academy participate in a rigorous curriculum with a focus on marine and environmental science. MATES emphasizes skills important to post-secondary study and employment in a global community. The school focuses on students who wish to concentrate in the areas of math and science. The academic course of study offered satisfies all of the state requirements necessary for high school graduation. Eligible students may also take college level courses throughout their course of study; credit received for a completed course varies.

Awards, recognition and rankings
In 2012, MATES became one of 17 New Jersey schools to be named a 2012 National Blue Ribbon School of Excellence by the United States Department of Education.

In its listing of "America's Best High Schools 2016", the school was ranked 84th out of 500 best high schools in the country; it was ranked 17th among all high schools in New Jersey.
Schooldigger.com ranked the school as one of 16 schools tied for first out of 381 public high schools statewide in its 2011 rankings (unchanged from the 2010 ranking) which were based on the combined percentage of students classified as proficient or above proficient on the language arts literacy (100.0%) and mathematics (100.0%) components of the High School Proficiency Assessment (HSPA).

References

External links
Marine Academy of Technology and Environmental Science

School Data for the Ocean County Vocational Technical School District, National Center for Education Statistics

Stafford Township, New Jersey
2001 establishments in New Jersey
Educational institutions established in 2001
Magnet schools in New Jersey
Middle States Commission on Secondary Schools
Public high schools in Ocean County, New Jersey